Malaga (Spanish: Málaga) is a census-designated place in Fresno County, California. As of the 2010 census, Malaga had a population of 947.

History
The post office, originally named Tokay, opened in 1886 and was renamed Malaga later that year. 

The post office closed in 1964, and reopened in 1965. 

The town was named for the Málaga grape.

Demographics
At the 2010 census Malaga had a population of 947. The racial makeup of Malaga was 418 (44.1%) White, 12 (1.3%) African American, 15 (1.6%) Native American, 11 (1.2%) Asian, 2 (0.2%) Pacific Islander, 464 (49.0%) from other races, and 25 (2.6%) from two or more races. Hispanic or Latino of any race were 891 people (94.1%).

The whole population lived in households, no one lived in non-institutionalized group quarters and no one was institutionalized.

There were 241 households, 135 (56.0%) had children under the age of 18 living in them, 126 (52.3%) were opposite-sex married couples living together, 56 (23.2%) had a female householder with no husband present, 24 (10.0%) had a male householder with no wife present.  There were 24 (10.0%) unmarried opposite-sex partnerships, and 1 (0.4%) same-sex married couples or partnerships. 31 households (12.9%) were one person and 17 (7.1%) had someone living alone who was 65 or older. The average household size was 3.93.  There were 206 families (85.5% of households); the average family size was 4.20.

The age distribution was 319 people (33.7%) under the age of 18, 116 people (12.2%) aged 18 to 24, 238 people (25.1%) aged 25 to 44, 182 people (19.2%) aged 45 to 64, and 92 people (9.7%) who were 65 or older.  The median age was 27.9 years. For every 100 females, there were 97.7 males.  For every 100 females age 18 and over, there were 97.5 males.

There were 268 housing units at an average density of ,of which 241 were occupied, 130 (53.9%) by the owners and 111 (46.1%) by renters.  The homeowner vacancy rate was 1.5%; the rental vacancy rate was 2.6%.  499 people (52.7% of the population) lived in owner-occupied housing units and 448 people (47.3%) lived in rental housing units.

References

Populated places established in 1886
Census-designated places in Fresno County, California
Census-designated places in California